The Sister Islands Conservation Area, commonly called the Sisters Island Group, is a conservation area of approximately  that comprises a group of three islands in Bass Strait, Tasmania, Australia.

Features and location
The three islands within the conservation area that is located north of Flinders Island in the Furneaux Group, are the:
 Inner Sister Island, located at 
 Outer Sister Island, located at 
 Shag Reef, located at

See also

 Kent Group National Park

References

External links
 

Furneaux Group
Conservation areas of Tasmania